Jay Morgan Philpot (born July 30, 1971) is a former state representative for District 45 in the heart of Salt Lake County and was the 2010 Republican nominee for . He is a former vice-chair of the Utah Republican Party. Philpot was also a candidate for Governor of Utah.

Biography 
Philpot was born in Molalla, Oregon. While attending the University of Utah, he interned at the White House in 1997. Having participated in Utah's caucus/convention system as a precinct chair, state delegate, and county delegate, he successfully ran for a seat in the Utah House of Representatives in 2000. He was re-elected in 2002. Just before the end of his second term, he resigned his seat in order to attend Ave Maria School of Law in Ann Arbor, Michigan.

Upon graduation in 2007, he returned to Utah where he worked for the Utah Attorney General's office before accepting a position as the General Counsel and Government Affairs director for Reagan Outdoor Advertising.

Utah House of Representatives 
While in office, Philpot sponsored the Carson Smith Special Needs Scholarship bill, the Prohibition of Public Funding for Abortion and the Designation of Constitution & Bill of Rights Day in Utah. He received awards from the Utah Taxpayer's Association, from "Grass Roots" which gave him top honors in 2002 (the first year they started the awards), 2003 and 2004. He also received the "Guardian of Small Business" from NFIB and the Statesmanship Citation from the Newquist group.

Post-legislative career

In early 2009, Philpot declared his intention to run against the incumbent vice-chair of the state Republican party. He claimed victory with 52% of the vote. While in office, he helped to create a Web Communications committee, which dramatically increased the party's digital engagement.
On Jan 15, 2010, he announced his resignation as party vice-chair and his intention to run for Utah's Second Congressional District. He advanced out of convention without a primary and was defeated by the incumbent, Democrat Jim Matheson, by 5%.

On December 1, 2011, Philpot publicly announced his plans to run for Governor of Utah. He came within a few percentage points of advancing out of convention to challenge the incumbent governor in the Republican primary.

In January 2016, Philpot announced his candidacy for the Utah State Senate.

Philpot became the lawyer for Ammon Bundy on May 25, 2016. On October 27, 2016 an Oregon jury returned a startling verdict finding Ammon Bundy not guilty on all charges. Philpot subsequently served as co-counsel for Ammon Bundy in the Nevada Gold Butte Standoff trial where Judge Gloria Navarro dismissed the case against Cliven, Ammon and Ryan Bundy and Ryan Payne with prejudice in early 2018 due to, among other things, outrageous government conduct.

Philpot also represents Jeanette Finicum in her wrongful death suit against the United States government for the killing of her husband Robert Lavoy Finicum during a combined FBI and Oregon State Police roadblock related to the 2016 occupation of the Malheur National Wildlife Refuge.

Personal life
Morgan lives in Alpine, Utah with his wife, Natalie, and their five children. In February 2012, Philpot walked away uninjured after a crash sent him and two campaign staffers down a 100-foot embankment.

References

External links
 
Campaign contributions at OpenSecrets.org

1971 births
Living people
People from Alpine, Utah
People from Molalla, Oregon
Utah lawyers
American Latter Day Saints
Republican Party members of the Utah House of Representatives
University of Utah alumni
Ave Maria School of Law alumni